Jeevan Jyoti is a 1976 Bollywood Drama film directed by Murugan Kumaran under AVM Productions. It stars Vijay Arora, Bindiya Goswami in lead roles. It is a remake of Telugu film Muthyala Muggu (1975).

Plot
Shekhar (Vijay Arora) goes to his friends sister Laxmi's (Bindiya Goswami) marriage with Mohan. During the marriage the police arrests Mohan. People begin to say who will marry Laxmi now.  Shekhar marries Laxmi. They are happy and Laxmi becomes expecting mother. When Mohan returns, he wants to take revenge. Hence he sneaks into Laxmi's bedroom in absence of Shekhar and Laxmi is sleeping. When Shekhar enters the room, he finds Mohan in Laxmi's room. He assumes that Laxmi and Mohan were in a relationship and he was the one who came in between. He asks Laxmi to leave his house. Laxmi leaves and then she gives birth to twins -Shanti and Ramu. Shanti and Ramu then create a plan to bring their parents together again. Their plan is successful and Mohan admits his crime. Shekhar realizes that Laxmi is pure and innocent, and he accepts her. Shekhar, Laxmi, Shanti and Ramu are together and happy in the end.

Cast
Vijay Arora as Shekhar
Bindiya Goswami as Laxmi 
Rakesh Pandey as Harbans
A. K. Hangal as Raja Kamlakar
Sulochana Chatterjee as Pratima
Dinesh Hingoo as Raja's Munim
Sudhir as Mohan
Satyendra Kapoor as Somnath
Om Shivpuri as Gopaldas Chaurasia
Dulari as Ratna Chaurasia
Bhanumathi as Lata Chaurasia
Jayamalini as Sudha
Bheeshma as Bhagwan Shri Hanuman
Ritu Kamal as Sundari
Baby Mun Mun as Shanti
Raju Shrestha as Ramu

Crew
Director - Murugan Kumaran
Story - Mullapudi Venkata Ramana
Producer - M. Saravanan, M. Balasubramanian, M. S. Guhan
Editor - R. G. Gope 
Production Company - A. V. M. Productions
Distributors - Rajshri Productions
Music Director - Salil Choudhury
Lyrics - Anand Bakshi
Playback Singers - Lata Mangeshkar, Kishore Kumar, Asha Bhosle, Usha Mangeshkar, P. B. Sreenivas

Music
Music: Salil Chowdhury
Lyricist: Anand Bakshi

External links
 

1976 films
1970s Hindi-language films
1976 drama films
Hindi remakes of Telugu films
Films scored by Salil Chowdhury